American singer Aaliyah released three studio albums, two compilation albums, and 26 singles. She was born in Brooklyn, New York, and was raised in Detroit, Michigan. At age 10, she appeared on Star Search and performed in concert alongside Gladys Knight. At age 12, Aaliyah was signed to Jive Records and Blackground Records by her uncle, Barry Hankerson. He introduced her to R. Kelly, who became her mentor, as well as lead songwriter and producer of her debut album. Age Ain't Nothing but a Number sold three million copies in the United States and was certified double Platinum by the Recording Industry Association of America (RIAA).  After facing allegations of an illegal marriage with Kelly, Aaliyah ended her contract with Jive and signed to Atlantic Records.

Aaliyah worked with record producers Timbaland and Missy Elliott for her second album, One in a Million, which sold three million copies in the United States and over eight million copies worldwide. In 2000, Aaliyah appeared in her first major film, Romeo Must Die. She also contributed to the film's soundtrack, where "Try Again" was released as a single. The song topped the Billboard Hot 100 solely on radio airplay, making Aaliyah the first artist in Billboard history to achieve this feat. "Try Again" earned Aaliyah a Grammy Award nomination for Best Female R&B Vocalist.

After completing Romeo Must Die, Aaliyah filmed her part in Queen of the Damned. She released her third and final album, Aaliyah, in July 2001. On August 25, 2001, Aaliyah and eight others were killed in a plane crash in The Bahamas after filming the music video for the single "Rock the Boat". The pilot, Luis Morales III, was unlicensed at the time of the accident and had traces of cocaine and alcohol in his system. Aaliyah's family later filed a wrongful death lawsuit against Blackhawk International Airways, which was settled out of court. Since then, Aaliyah has achieved commercial success with several posthumous releases. As of December 2008, she has sold 8.1 million albums in the United States and an estimated 24 to 32 million albums worldwide.

Albums

Studio albums

Compilation albums

Singles

As lead artist

As featured artist

Other charted songs

Guest appearances

Video albums

Music videos

Guest appearances/cameos
 "Summer Bunnies" (R. Kelly featuring Aaliyah)
 "Freedom" (Various Artists featuring Aaliyah)
 "I Need You Tonight" (Junior M.A.F.I.A. featuring Aaliyah)
 "One More Chance"/"Stay with Me" (The Notorious B.I.G.) [Cameo]
 "Crush on You" (Lil' Kim featuring Lil' Cease) [Cameo]
 "Up Jumps da Boogie" (Timbaland & Magoo featuring Missy Elliott & Aaliyah)
 "Luv 2 Luv Ya" (Timbaland & Magoo featuring Shaunta Montegomery) [Cameo]
 "Make It Hot" (Nicole Wray featuring Missy Elliott & Mocha) [Cameo]
 "Here We Come" (Timbaland featuring Magoo & Missy Elliott) [Cameo]
 "Holiday" (Naughty by Nature) [Cameo]
 "We at It Again" (Timbaland & Magoo featuring Static & introducing Sebastian) [Cameo]
 "Don't Think They Know" (Chris Brown featuring Aaliyah)

Notes

A  "Are You Ready" did not enter the Hot R&B/Hip-Hop Songs chart, but peaked at number 42 on the Hot R&B/Hip-Hop Airplay chart.
B  "One in a Million" did not enter the Billboard Hot 100, but peaked at number 25 on the Hot 100 Airplay chart. It did not enter the Hot R&B/Hip-Hop Songs chart, but peaked at number 1 on the Hot R&B/Hip-Hop Airplay chart.
C  "4 Page Letter" did not enter the Billboard Hot 100, but peaked at number 55 on the Hot 100 Airplay chart. It did not enter the Hot R&B/Hip-Hop Songs chart, but peaked at number 12 on the Hot R&B/Hip-Hop Airplay chart.
D  "Hot Like Fire" and "The One I Gave My Heart To" charted as a double A-side single in the United Kingdom.
E  "Hot Like Fire" did not enter the Hot R&B/Hip-Hop Songs chart, but peaked at number 31 on the Hot R&B/Hip-Hop Airplay chart.
F  "Are You That Somebody" did not enter the Hot R&B/Hip-Hop Songs chart, but peaked at number 1 on the Hot R&B/Hip-Hop Airplay  chart.
G  "Come Back in One Piece" did not enter the Billboard Hot 100, but peaked at number 17 on the Bubbling Under Hot 100 Singles chart, which acts as a 25-song extension to the Hot 100.
H  "Poison" did not enter the Hot R&B/Hip-Hop Songs chart, but peaked at number 15 on the Hot R&B Songs chart.
I  "Poison" did not enter the NZ Top 40 Singles Chart, but peaked at number 33 on the NZ Hot Singles Chart.
J  "I Need You Tonight" did not enter the Billboard Hot 100, but peaked at number 3 on the Bubbling Under Hot 100 Singles chart, which acts as a 25-song extension to the Hot 100.
K  "Final Warning" did not enter the Hot R&B/Hip-Hop Songs chart, but peaked at number 23 on the Bubbling Under R&B/Hip-Hop Singles chart, which acts as a 25-song extension to the Hot R&B/Hip-Hop Songs chart.
L  "You Won't See Me Tonight" did not enter the Billboard Hot 100, but peaked at number 21 on the Bubbling Under Hot 100 Singles chart, which acts as a 25-song extension to the Hot 100.
M  "I Can Be" did not enter the Hot R&B/Hip-Hop Songs chart, but peaked at number 2 on the Bubbling Under R&B/Hip-Hop Singles chart, which acts as a 25-song extension to the Hot R&B/Hip-Hop Songs chart.
N  "Where Could He Be" did not enter the Hot R&B/Hip-Hop Songs chart, but peaked at number 20 on the Bubbling Under R&B/Hip-Hop Singles chart, which acts as a 25-song extension to the Hot R&B/Hip-Hop Songs chart.
O Aaliyah's second studio album One in a Million,  sold an extra 756,000 units through BMG Music club, Nielsen SoundScan does not count albums sold through clubs like the BMG Music Service, which were significantly popular in the 1990s.
P  Aaliyah's eponymous album sold an extra 350,000 units through BMG Music club, Nielsen SoundScan does not count albums sold through clubs like the BMG Music Service, which were significantly popular in the 1990s.

References

Further reading

External links
 

Discography
Discographies of American artists
Contemporary R&B discographies
Pop music discographies
Hip hop discographies